The Western States Hockey League (WSHL) was a junior ice hockey league established in 1993. It was sanctioned by the United Hockey Union, the junior hockey branch of the Amateur Athletic Union. Previously, it was sanctioned by USA Hockey from 1994 to 2011.  Teams played approximately 50 games in the regular season schedule, mimicking what players would experience at the collegiate level. As of January 2022, there are no active teams in the league following the creation of the Can-Am Junior Hockey League by former WSHL teams.

History

Year one consisted of six teams, spanning Arizona, California, Nevada and Utah, with all member clubs playing a 30-game schedule operating as Tier III Junior B teams. The league was founded by Dr. Don Thorne and the Thorne Cup championship trophy was named in his recognition. The Anaheim Jr. Ducks won the first Thorne Cup Championship that season and was the last franchise from the inaugural season still in existence as the Long Beach Bombers until 2019. The Long Beach franchise was sold and the Bombers brand was then used as an expansion team called the Barrhead Bombers.

Current commissioner Ron White took over operation of the WSHL in 1995 and continued to expand the league footprint. In 2007, the WSHL upgraded their league status from the Tier III Junior B level to Junior A to attract higher quality prospects.

In 2011, the league joined the Amateur Athletic Union (AAU) and dropped its USA Hockey sanctioning leading to the loss of its most successful franchise, the Phoenix Polar Bears, while adding many new teams. After the WSHL's success without USA Hockey, the United Hockey Union (UHU) was formed under the AAU sanctioning along with the Northern States Hockey League (NSHL) and the Midwest Junior Hockey League (MWJHL). The UHU leagues continued to operate with Tier III Junior A player requirements.

The WSHL has had numerous teams participate and win the USA Hockey and UHU National Championship over the years and most recently, the El Paso Rhinos were crowned the United Hockey Union National Champions in 2014. The WSHL has had great success in moving players on to the college hockey ranks through the "Western States Shootout", an annual all-league showcase held every December in Las Vegas, Nevada. The event averages in excess of 80 scouts in attendance, all of whom are looking to bolster their roster for the following season.

In 2015, the WSHL Board of Governors announced the approval of the league to start competing as a Tier II-level player league for a higher caliber of play beginning in the 2015–16 season. Prior to the announcement the only Tier II-level league in the United States was the North American Hockey League. However, unlike the USA Hockey-sanctioned Tier II NAHL, the UHU-sanctioned WSHL operates similar to the Canadian Junior Hockey League's Junior "A" status and continues to charge player tuition to help pay for team travel expenses. In the 2015–16 season, the WSHL grew to its largest membership with 29 teams across 14 states. In 2018, the league expanded into western Canada with a Provinces Division in the WSHL that had originally been announced to play as its own league called the Western Provinces Hockey Association (WPHA). After one season, the WSHL's association with the WPHA dissolved and removed the teams that had been directly operated by the owners of the WPHA. The WPHA then joined the Greater Metro Junior A Hockey League, an independent junior league primarily based in Ontario.

In April 2020, the WSHL lost the Fresno Monsters, Las Vegas Thunderbirds, Northern Colorado Eagles, Ogden Mustangs, Ontario Avalanche, Pueblo Bulls, San Diego Sabers, Southern Oregon Spartans, and the Utah Outliers to the United States Premier Hockey League, another independent junior hockey organization. The Oklahoma City Jr. Blazers then left on May 19, 2020, to join to the North American 3 Hockey League (NA3HL). On May 26, 2020, the WSHL announced it would be dormant for the 2020–21 season due to the on-going COVID-19 pandemic, stating the league was already they have begun preparing to return for the 2021–22 season. In June 2020, the El Paso Rhinos also left for the NA3HL for the 2020–21 season with the intention of joining the NAHL for the 2021–22 season.

In January 2021, the league stated that it still intended to return for a 2021–22 season. In August, the league gave an update with six new teams and five returning teams split into two divisions: Northwest and Provincial. The schedule was released in September and the league had lost the Vancouver Devils expansion team. The season started the last weekend of October and the expansion Utah Altitude folded after one game played. By November 5, the Northwest Division was announced as going dormant for the season with no games played by Bellingham, Rogue Valley, or Seattle. Bellingham and Vernal then joined the Provincial Division, but Bellingham withdrew after playing five games. By January 2022, the six remaining teams left the WSHL and started another league called the Can-Am Junior Hockey League (CAJHL) to finish the season independently.

Champions

Team history
Full list of teams that have played in the WSHL.

 Anaheim Junior Ducks – (Anaheim, California) 1994–1996 → Southern California Jr. Bombers
 Arizona Bandits – (Phoenix, Arizona) 1994–1995
 Las Vegas Junior Aces – (Las Vegas, Nevada) 1994–1995 → Las Vegas Jr. Thunder
 San Jose Junior Sharks – (San Jose, California) 1994–1996
 Utah Lightning – (Salt Lake City, Utah) 1994–1996 → Utah Jr. Grizzlies
 Ventura Mariners – (Simi Valley, California) 1994–2001
 Las Vegas Junior Thunder – (Las Vegas, Nevada) 1995–1996
 Alaska Arctic Ice – (Anchorage, Alaska) 1996–1999
 Flagstaff Mountaineers – (Flagstaff, Arizona) 1996–1999
 New Mexico Ice Breakers – (Albuquerque, New Mexico) 1996–2001
 Southern California Junior Bombers – (Lakewood, California) 1996–2006 → Bay City Bombers
 Utah Junior Grizzlies – (Salt Lake City, Utah) 1996–2001 → Salt Lake Maple Leafs
 Colorado Cougars – (Denver, Colorado) 1997–1999
 Fairbanks Ice Dogs – (Fairbanks, Alaska) 1997–1999
 Las Vegas Bandits – (Las Vegas, Nevada) 1997–1998
 Peninsula Hellfighters – (Kenai Peninsula, Alaska) 1997–1999
 Sinbad Sailors – (Anchorage, Alaska) 1997–1999
 Utah Valley Golden Eagles – (Provo, Utah) 1997–2002
 Las Vegas Blackjacks – (Las Vegas, Nevada) 1998–1999
 Nevada Gamblers – (Las Vegas, Nevada) 1998–2000
 Yukon Claim Jumpers – (Whitehorse, Yukon) 1998–1999
 Phoenix Polar Bears – (Phoenix, Arizona) 1999–2011 → Phoenix Knights
 Las Vegas Outlaws – (Las Vegas, Nevada) 2000–2001
 Nevada Rattlers – (Las Vegas, Nevada) 2001–2003
 Salt Lake Maple Leafs – (Salt Lake City, Utah) 2001–2002 → Salt Lake Jr. Grizzlies
 San Diego Surf – (San Diego, California) 2001–2008 → San Diego Gulls
 Valencia Flyers – (Valencia, California) 2001–2003 → Valencia Vipers – 2003–2009 → Valencia Flyers – 2009–2020
 Capital Thunder – (Roseville, California) 2002–2004, 2005–2009
 Salt Lake Junior Grizzlies – (Salt Lake City, Utah) 2002–04
 Bazooka Blues – (Tulsa, Oklahoma) 2004–2006 → Tulsa Rampage
 Dallas Titans – (Dallas, Texas) 2004–2006
 Idaho Rattlers – (Boise, Idaho) 2004–2006
 Valencia Vipers – (Valencia, California) 2004–2009 → Valencia Flyers
 Cajun Catahoulas – (Lafayette, Louisiana) 2005–2008 → Texas Renegades
 Fort Worth Texans – (Fort Worth, Texas) 2005–2006
 Peoria Coyotes – (Peoria, Arizona) 2005–2007
 San Antonio Diablos – (San Antonio, Texas) 2005–2010
 Bay City Bombers – (Lakewood, California) 2006–2010 → Long Beach Bombers
 Dallas Hawks – (Addison, Texas) 2006–2009
 El Paso Rhinos – (El Paso, Texas) 2006–2020
 Long Beach Bulldogs – (Lakewood, California) 2006–2007
 Tucson Tilt – (Tucson, Arizona) 2006–2007
 Tulsa Rampage – (Tulsa, Oklahoma) 2006–2011 → Cheyenne Stampede
 Colorado Outlaws – (Westminster, Colorado) 2007–2009 → Boulder Jr. Bison
 San Diego Gulls – (Escondido, California) 2008–2015 → San Diego Sabers
 Texas Renegades – (Dallas, Texas) 2008–2009 → New Mexico Renegades
 Arizona RedHawks – (Peoria, Arizona) 2009–2015 → Arizona Hawks
 Bakersfield Junior Condors – (Bakersfield, California) 2009–2011 → Ogden Mustangs
 Boulder Junior Bison – (Superior, Colorado) 2009–2014 → Colorado RoughRiders
 Fresno Monsters – (Fresno, California) 2009–2020 (joined USPHL)
 Idaho Junior Steelheads – (Boise/McCall, Idaho) 2009–2017 → Idaho IceCats
 New Mexico Renegades – (Rio Rancho, New Mexico) 2009–2014 → Springfield Express
 Long Beach Bombers – (Lakewood, California) 2010–2019 → Barrhead Bombers
 Texas Junior Brahmas – (North Richland Hills, Texas) 2010–2014
 Cheyenne Stampede – (Cheyenne, Wyoming) 2011–2019
 Dallas Ice Jets – (Grapevine, Texas) 2011–2014
 Dallas Snipers – (Euless, Texas) 2011–2020
 Park City Moose – (Park City, Utah) 2011–2012 → Salt Lake City Moose
 Phoenix Knights – (Gilbert, Arizona) 2011–2018
 Ogden Mustangs – (Ogden, Utah) 2011–2020 (joined USPHL)
 Bay Area Seals – (Daly City, California) 2012–2013 → Lake Tahoe Blue
 Ontario Avalanche – (Ontario, California) 2012–2020 (joined USPHL as Anaheim Avalanche)
 Salt Lake City Moose – (Salt Lake City/West Valley City, Utah) 2012–2016 → Utah Outliers
 Seattle Totems – (Mountlake Terrace, Washington) 2012–2021 (joined USPHL)
 Southern Oregon Spartans – (Medford, Oregon) 2012–2020 (joined USPHL)
 Tulsa Junior Oilers – (Tulsa, Oklahoma) 2012–2017
 Wichita Junior Thunder – (Wichita, Kansas) 2012–2020
 Colorado Junior Eagles – (Fort Collins, Colorado) 2013–2018 → Northern Colorado Eagles
 Lake Tahoe Blue – (South Lake Tahoe, California) 2013–2015 → Tahoe Icemen
 Missoula Maulers – (Missoula, Montana) 2013–2016
 Butte Cobras – (Butte, Montana) 2014–2017
 Casper Coyotes – (Casper, Wyoming) 2014–2018 → Casper Bobcats
 Colorado Evolution – (Denver, Colorado) 2014–2016
 Colorado RoughRiders – (Superior, Colorado) 2014–2015 → Superior RoughRiders
 Las Vegas Storm – (Las Vegas, Nevada) 2014–2017
 Oklahoma City Jr. Blazers – (Oklahoma City, Oklahoma) 2014–2020 (joined NA3HL)
 Springfield Express – (Springfield, Missouri) 2014–2018
 Whitefish Wolverines – (Whitefish, Montana) 2014–2016
 Arizona Hawks – (Peoria, Arizona) 2015–2017
 San Diego Sabers – (Escondido, California) 2015–2020 (joined USPHL)
 Superior RoughRiders – (Superior, Colorado) 2015–2018
 Tahoe Icemen – (South Lake Tahoe, California) 2015–2018
 Vancouver Rangers – (Vancouver, Washington) 2015–2017 → West Sound Warriors
 Bellingham Blazers – (Bellingham, Washington) 2016–2021 (joined USPHL)
 Utah Outliers – (West Valley City, Utah) 2016–2020 (joined USPHL)
 Vail Powder Hounds – (Vail, Colorado) 2016 (Originally joined as the Breckenridge Bucks from the RMJHL but had to relocate to Vail and then folded midseason.)
 Idaho IceCats – (McCall, Idaho) 2017–2018
 West Sound Warriors – (Bremerton, Washington) 2017–2018 → West Sound Admirals
 Casper Bobcats – (Casper, Wyoming) 2018–2019
 Cold Lake Wings – (Cold Lake, Alberta) 2018–2019 (Western Provinces Hockey Association)
 Edson Aeros – (Edson, Alberta) 2018–2021(from Western Provinces Hockey Association) → Cold Lake Aeros
 Hinton Wildcats – (Hinton, Alberta) 2018–2019 (Western Provinces Hockey Association)
 Meadow Lake Mustangs – (Meadow Lake, Saskatchewan) 2018–2020 (from Western Provinces Hockey Association)
 Northern Colorado Eagles – (Greeley, Colorado) 2018–2020 (joined USPHL)
 Steamboat Wranglers – (Steamboat Springs, Colorado) 2018–2019
 West Sound Admirals – (Bremerton, Washington) 2018–2019
 Barrhead Bombers – (Barrhead, Alberta) First franchise: 2019–2021 → Rogue Valley Royals; Second franchise: 2021–2022 (joined CAJHL)
 Cold Lake Hornets – (Cold Lake, Alberta) 2019–2020
 Hinton Timberwolves – (Hinton, Alberta) 2019–2022 (joined CAJHL)
 Las Vegas Thunderbirds – (Las Vegas, Nevada) 2019–2020 (joined USPHL)
 Pueblo Bulls – (Pueblo, Colorado) 2019–2020 (joined USPHL)
 Cold Lake Aeros – (Cold Lake, Alberta) 2021–2022 (joined CAJHL)
 Edmonton Eagles – Enoch, Alberta) 2021–2022 (joined CAJHL)
 Rogue Valley Royals – (Medford, Oregon) (Never played in the WSHL; joined USPHL in 2022)
 Utah Altitude – (Kearns, Utah) 2021
 Vegreville Vipers – (Vegreville, Alberta) 2021–2022 (joined CAJHL)
 Vernal Oilers – (Vernal, Utah) 2021–2022 (joined CAJHL)

Western Prospects League
As part of the approval of the WSHL to Tier II status in 2015, the WSHL Board of Governors also announced the formation of the Western Prospects League (WPL), a United Hockey Union approved Tier III development league for the WSHL. In its only season (2015–16), the WPL played with four Tier III prospect teams under Tier II organizations (the Casper Coyotes, Cheyenne Stampede, El Paso Rhinos, and Ogden Mustangs) with occasional games against non-WSHL affiliated teams.

In 2016, the UHU approved of two other Tier III leagues, the Canadian Premier Junior Hockey League (CPJHL) and the National College Prospects Hockey League (NCPHL). Several of the WSHL organizations then announced affiliations with some of the NCPHL teams to act as a developmental team and the WPL appears to have been disbanded.

Western Prospects League Champions

References

External links
 WSHL.org
 United Hockey Union

Junior ice hockey leagues in the United States
1993 establishments in the United States
Sports leagues established in 1993